The Roman Catholic Diocese of Buxar (Latin: Dioecesis Buxarensis) in India was created on December 12, 2005. It is a suffragan diocese of the Archdiocese of Patna. The parish church "Mary Mother of Perpetual Help" in Buxar is the cathedral for the diocese.

The diocese covers an area of 11,311 km² of the Patna state, comprising the districts Buxar, Bhojpur, Bhabua, and Rohtas. The territory was previously administrated by the Archdiocese of Patna. The Sone River marks the boundary between the dioceses Patna and Buxar to the southeast. Other dioceses bordering are Varanasi to the west, Muzaffarpur to the north, and Daltonganj to the south.

The total population in the diocese is 5,781,132, of which 15,745 are Catholic. The diocese is subdivided into 13 parishes.

Leadership
 William D'Souza, S.J. (25 March 2006 – 1 October 2007)
 Sebastian Kallupura (21 June 2009 – 29 June 2018)

External links 
 GCatholic.org
 Catholic-hierarchy.org
 Vatican press release on the creation 

Buxar
Christianity in Bihar
Christian organizations established in 2005
Roman Catholic dioceses and prelatures established in the 21st century
2005 establishments in Bihar